Ford Otomotiv Sanayi A.Ş. (Ford Automotive Industry) is an automotive manufacturing company based in Turkey that is equally owned by Ford Motor Company and Koç Holding. It was established in its current form in 1977, with original relations dating back to 1928. It currently operates five facilities throughout the country, and is headquartered in Gölcük, with a second location in İnönü.

History
The collaboration began in 1928, when Vehbi Koç was assigned as a Ford dealer in Ankara. The following year, the Turkish national assembly granted Ford the right to install a local assembly plant in a free zone located in Tophane, Istanbul's port area. Coinciding with great depression of 1929, limited numbers of Ford Model A and Ford Model B vehicles were assembled in Tophane Plant of Ford Motor Company Exports Inc. until 1934, when vehicle assembly activities were suspended.

In 1959, the foundation of the Otosan (Otomotiv Sanayii/Automotive Industry) factory was held in Istanbul, and in 1960 the Ford Consul was the first model to be produced at the plant, followed by the Thames and the Thames Trader van. In 1965, the D1210 truck was added to production, and in 1966, the Anadol, the first mass-production passenger vehicle developed in Turkey. In 1967, the Ford Transit also began production and in 1973, the Anadol STC-16, the first sports car developed in Turkey.

In 1977, the company signed a license agreement with Ford and the company's name was changed to Ford Otosan. In 1979, took place the groundbreaking ceremony for a new factory in İnönü, Eskişehir, which began production of the Ford Cargo in 1983. Also that year, Ford increased its share of ownership in the company to 30 percent. In 1985 the Ford Taunus began production at the Istanbul plant, and in 1986 the official opening ceremony was held for the İnönü engine plant.

In 1992, the newer Ford Transit was put into production, and in 1993 the Ford Escort replaced the Ford Taunus on the production lines. In 1997, Ford further increased its share in the company to 41 percent, becoming equal partner with Koç Holding in the joint venture. In 1998, the groundbreaking ceremony was held for the new factory in Gölcük, Kocaeli, that became operational in 2001, replacing the Istanbul facility. It is aimed mainly at commercial vehicle production, and manufactures the Ford Transit and the Ford Transit Connect, both models being marketed worldwide. In 2003, the company launched a new generation of the Ford Cargo heavy-duty truck.

In September 2012, Ford revealed its new version of the Transit, and in January 2013 the new Cargo heavy truck was unveiled. The latter was co-developed by Ford Otosan in partnership with 
Ford Brazil, and will be manufactured in both countries.

In September 2018, at the IAA Commercial Vehicles show in Hannover, Germany, Ford introduced an electric tractor trailer concept vehicle dubbed the F-Vision, which would have Level 4 autonomous driving capability.

In March 2022, Ford Otosan announced that company would acquire Ford Romania from Ford Motor Company.

Facilities
The company operates five facilities throughout the country. The Kocaeli Plant, located in Gölcük, was opened in 2001, and has been the main global production center for the Transit and the Transit Connect. It has an annual production capacity of 320,000 vehicles and has its own port.

The İnönü Plant, located in Eskişehir, began operating in 1982, and has been the production center of the Cargo heavy truck, as well as for engines and powertrains. It has an annual capacity of 10,000 trucks, 66,000 engines and 45,000 gearboxes.

The Kartal Parts Distribution Center, located in the Sancaktepe district of Istanbul, has been operating since 1998, and it is the marketing centre of the company's marketing, sales, after-sales and spare parts operations.

The Sancaktepe Engineering Center, located in the Sancaktepe district of Istanbul, was established in 2014, and is responsible for the development of the newest products and technologies. It employs over 1000 product development engineers.

The Yeniköy plant started production of the Transit/Tourneo Courier in the second quarter of 2014. It is located within the Kocaeli facility, but as a different production plant, with a starting capacity of 110,000 vehicles per year.

Products

Current
 Ford Transit (1965–present)
 Ford Cargo (1983–present)
 Ford Transit Custom (2012–present)
 Ford Transit Courier (2014–present)
 Ford F-MAX heavy truck (2018–present)

Historic

 Ford Consul (1960–1961)
 Thames Trader (1961–1965)
 Ford D1210 (1965–1983)
 Anadol (1966–1984)
 Anadol STC-16 (1973–1975)
 Ford Taunus (1985–1993)
Otosan P100 (1986-1997)
 Ford Escort (1993–1999)
 Ford Transit Connect (2002–2013)

See also 
Ford Ecotorq engine
List of companies of Turkey

References

External links

 

Motor vehicle manufacturers of Turkey
Economy of Kocaeli Province
Vehicle manufacturing companies established in 1959
Joint ventures
Koç family
İzmit
Ford Motor Company
Companies listed on the Istanbul Stock Exchange
Turkish companies established in 1959